Max Lindholm (born 27 December 1990) is a Finnish former ice dancer. With partner Olesia Karmi, he is the 2015 CS Ice Challenge bronze medalist, 2014 NRW Trophy bronze medalist, and a two-time (2013 and 2015) Finnish national champion. The duo reached the free skate at two ISU Championships – 2013 Europeans in Zagreb and 2015 Europeans in Stockholm. They were 22nd at the 2013 World Championships in London, Ontario.

Karmi and Lindholm ended their partnership in February 2016. They reconsidered a few months later and on April 20, 2016 announced that they would continue competing together.

Programs 
(with Karmi)

Competitive highlights 
with Karmi

CS: Challenger Series; JGP: Junior Grand Prix

References

External links 
 

1990 births
Finnish male ice dancers
Living people
Sportspeople from Espoo